Michael Glover (1922–1990) was a military historian.

Michael Glover may also refer to:

 Michael Glover (author), author, poet, art critic and magazine editor

See also
 Mike Glover (disambiguation)
 Michael Gover